Arley Rodríguez (born 13 February 1993) is a Colombian professional footballer who plays as forward for Deportivo Pereira.

Honours

Club 
Atlético Nacional
 Superliga Colombiana (1): 2016

References

External links 
 

1993 births
Living people
Colombian footballers
Colombian expatriate footballers
Categoría Primera A players
Categoría Primera B players
Liga MX players
Atlético Nacional footballers
Alianza Petrolera players
Elche CF Ilicitano footballers
Atlético F.C. footballers
Leones F.C. footballers
Lobos BUAP footballers
Independiente Santa Fe footballers
Envigado F.C. players
Carlos A. Mannucci players
Club Alianza Lima footballers
People from Archipelago of San Andrés, Providencia and Santa Catalina
Association football forwards
Colombian expatriate sportspeople in Mexico
Colombian expatriate sportspeople in Peru
Expatriate footballers in Mexico
Expatriate footballers in Peru